Sir John Pomeroy (c. 1347 – 1416), of Berry Pomeroy, Devon, was an English politician.

He was a Member (MP) of the Parliament of England for Totnes in 1407.

References

1347 births
1416 deaths
English MPs 1407
High Sheriffs of Devon
Knights Bachelor
Members of the Parliament of England (pre-1707) for Totnes